The United States and Mexican Boundary Survey (1848–1855) determined the border between the United States and Mexico as defined in the Treaty of Guadalupe Hidalgo, which had ended the Mexican–American War. In 1850, the U.S. government commissioned John Russel Bartlett to lead the survey. The results of the survey were published in the three volumes entitled Report on the United States and Mexican boundary survey, made under the direction of the secretary of the Interior by William H. Emory (1857-1859).

In addition to its documentation of the new  boundary, the survey report was notable for its natural history content, including paleontology, botany, ichthyology, herpetology, ornithology, and mammalogy. The survey was also provided to the war department now known as the United States Department of War in order to provide data for building a railroad line.

In the report's section titled, "Personal Accounts", a brief description of Panama is also included, along with the experiences he and his men had while conducting the survey, including the experiences of having an insufficient funding which was essentially starving out the men as prices around them rose trying to exploit their presence. Further funds were eventually sent but only after a state of disarray over changes in management for the project. Even when the funds were sent they were embezzled by one of the new commissioners, prompting Emory to go to Washington himself to secure additional funds.

Even after this the funds still took time to reach the workers, who after Emory's return had started to mutiny and riot causing a complete halt in production. Emory, in order to resolve the situation was given authority directly from the Department of the Interior to requisition funds directly which he used to pay a portion of the workers.

Instances of attacks from Native Americans on survey groups are also noted in the accounts with a request to the War Department for military escorts. Twenty-five hand-colored lithographic plates of birds were included in the volume Zoology of the Boundary, edited by Spencer Fullerton Baird. These illustrations were prepared by J.T. Bowen and Company of Philadelphia, the same firm that had produced the octavo edition of Audubon's Birds of America. Numerous illustrations of plants, reptiles, and amphibians were included, colored in some editions. The hand-colored lithographs of scenery and ethnography are important historical records.

As a result of the boundary survey and subsequent treaties, the U.S. and Mexico established the International Boundary and Water Commission (IBWC) in 1889 to maintain the border, allocate river waters between the two nations, and provide for flood control and water sanitation. Once viewed as a model of international cooperation, in recent decades the IBWC has been heavily criticized as an institutional anachronism.

See also
 Pacific Railroad Surveys

References

 Ann Shelby Blum (1993). Picturing Nature: American Nineteenth-Century Zoological Illustration. Princeton, New Jersey: Princeton University Press, 403 pages. .
 Sacheverell Sitwell, Handasyde Buchanan, James Fisher (1990). Fine Bird Books, 1700-1900. Grove/Atlantic. 
 Robert Taft (1953). Artists and Illustrators of the Old West 1850-1900. New York: Scribner's. .
 United States Department of the Interior (1857–59). Report on the United States and Mexican Boundary Survey, made under the direction of the Secretary of the Interior by William H. Emory Washington, D.C.: C. Wendell, printer. Three volumes, bound in two.
 Herman J. Viola (1987). Exploring the West. Washington, D.C.: Smithsonian Books. 256 pages. .
 Edward S. Wallace (1955). The Great Reconnaissance: Soldiers, Artists and Scientists on the Frontier 1848–1861. Boston, MA: Little, Brown and Company. 288 pages.

Mexico–United States border
Exploration of North America
Mexican–American War